Kamyshenka is a rural locality (a selo) in Zavyalovsky District, Altai Krai, Russia. The population was 877 as of 2016. There are 14 streets.

Geography 
Kamyshenka is located 28 km southwest of Zavyalovo (the district's administrative centre) by road. Chernavka is the nearest rural locality.

Ethnicity 
The village is inhabited by Ukrainians and others.

References 

Rural localities in Zavyalovsky District, Altai Krai